Paul McCabe is a Canadian Magic: The Gathering player. He is known for his success in the 1996-97 Pro Tour season. During this season, McCabe reached the top eight of two Pro Tours, and won the Player of the Year title. He has had no significant finishes in Professional Magic since.

Achievements

Other accomplishments

 Pro Tour Player of the Year 1996-97

References

Canadian Magic: The Gathering players
Living people
Year of birth missing (living people)